First Air Group (E 1), previously named Air Group and later named Attack Group was an air group unit in the Swedish Air Force. The First Air Group was the collective name given to the attack wings who would jointly carry out heavier attacks in the event of war. It was active in various formations from 1938 to 1995. It was directly subordinate to the Supreme Commander of the Swedish Armed Forces and therefore nicknamed ÖB:s klubba ("Supreme Commander's club").

Naming
Since its foundation in 1926, the Swedish Air Force grouped its aircraft into Flygkår (Air Corps, like the Första flygkåren, Andra flygkåren, Tredje flygkåren - the First, the Second, the Third Air Corps etc.), this being the aviation equivalent of an army regiment. In 1936 the Swedish Air Force switched from army-like to navy-like naming of its flying units. Thus the "air corps" became "flying flotillas" (flygflottiljer, sing. flygflottilj) with the respective geographic region added as an official name, thus the Second Air Corps (Andra Flygkår) established in 1926 became the Second Royal Roslagen Flying Flotilla (Andra Kungliga Roslagens Flygflottilj) in 1936. Following the naval nomenclature these flying flotillas were further divided into divisions (divisioner, sing. division) like the navy's destroyer divisions. 

In the end of 1938, the Swedish Air Force formed an air squadron (Flygeskadern) in the end of 1938. In 1942, it became the First Air Squadron (E1 Första Flygeskadern), with the Second and Third to follow in 1943 and the Fourth in 1945. So the traditional Swedish naming of air units is as follows:
 Eskader or Flygeskader - USAF Air Division or RAF Air Group equivalent 
 Flottilj or Flygflottilj - USAF Air Wing or RAF Station equivalent  
 Division - Air Squadron
 Grupp - Flight

History
According to the Defence Act of 1936, an air group commander would in case of war carry out the immediate command of the Swedish Air Force units that were part of the air group. In peacetime, his duties were to plan exercises, inspect wing exercises, and conduct co-exercises and major practical exercises, that is, not to have constant command of Swedish Air Force wings. Flygeskadern (the "Air Group") was organized in response to the emergency preparedness in September 1939 and was resolved (except for the staff) in the latter part of 1940. According to the Defence Act of 1942, four air groups would be permanently organized and in peacetime command the constituent wings regarding tactical and operational exercises. Its staff was located in Karlsborg from 1939 to 1942. In 1942, the Swedish Air Force expanded its war organization into four air groups and the Air Group was renamed First Air Group (Första flygeskadern, E 1), with its staff in Stockholm. The distribution of the Swedish Air Force wings to the air groups varied from 1 July 1945, when all four air groups had been organized. The First Air Group had attack duties, the Second and Third Air Group had fighter duties and the Fourth Air Group had reconnaissance duties.

The staff were merged with the staff of the Western Airbase Area (Västra flygbasområdet, Flybo V) on 1 October 1957, and was placed in Gothenburg. This air group was meant to have attack duties. Its command center Björn, was located south of Skara. In 1966, the First Air Group became the only air group in the Swedish Air Force, when the three others were decommissioned. The commander of the First Air Group was subordinate to the Supreme Commander of the Swedish Armed Forces according to instruction by the King in Council. Issues concerning unit training and production, the commander of the First Air Group was subordinate to the Chief of the Air Force. The First Air Group was then renamed Attackeskadern ("Attack Group") and was led by a joint staff based in Gothenburg until it was decommissioned in 1995. The decommissioning decision came in conjunction with the Defence Act of 1992, in which it was decided that three geographic air commands were to be established on 1 July 1993 and subsequently retrieved the duties from the First Air Group. At the decommissioning, the traditions and history of the First Air Group were transferred to the Chief of Air Force Staff, which on 30 June 1998 handed them over to the Air Force Center.

Organisation

1938–1940

1942–1948

1948–1957

1957–1966

1966–1995

Commanding officers
Between 1938 and 1941 and 1994 to 1995 the commander had the rank of colonel. Between 1941 and 1994, the commander had the rank of major general.

Commanders
List of commanders:

1938-01-07 – 1942-06-30: Bengt Nordenskiöld
1942-07-01 – 1952-03-31: Paulus af Uhr
1952-04-01 – 1964-03-31: Björn Bjuggren
1964-04-01 – 1966-09-30: Stig Norén
1966-10-01 – 1973-03-31: Gösta Odqvist
1973-04-04 – 1977-06-30: Bengt Rosenius
1977-07-01 – 1980-09-30: Sven-Olof Olson
1980-10-01 – 1983-09-30: Erik Nygren
1983-10-01 – 1990-09-30: Bertil Nordström
1990-10-01 – 1994-10-01: Bert Stenfeldt
1994-10-01 – 1995-06-30: Christer Salsing (acting)

Deputy commanders
After the airbase areas were decommissioned on 30 September 1957, a deputy commander position was added. The deputy commander had the rank of colonel. When all the air groups (except the First Air Group) were decommissioned in 1966, the deputy commander position disappeared.
1957–1964: Gösta Sandberg (acting)
1964–1966: Karl-Erik Karlsson

Names, designations and locations

References

Notes

Print

Further reading

External links
E 1's Friendship Association 

Military units and formations of the Swedish Air Force
Military units and formations established in 1938
Military units and formations disestablished in 1995
1938 establishments in Sweden
1995 disestablishments in Sweden
Karlsborg Garrison
Stockholm Garrison
Gothenburg Garrison